Blind Loves is a 2008 Slovak film directed by Juraj Lehotský.  It was Slovakia's official submission for the 2009 Academy Award for Best Foreign Language Film.

Reception
CineMagazine rated the documentary 4 stars.

References

External links
 

2008 films
Slovak documentary films
Films about disability